Starobin is a surname. Notable people with the surname include:

David Starobin (born 1951), American classical guitarist, record producer and film director
Michael Starobin (born 1956), American orchestrator and music arranger

See also
Starobin, Belarus, a municipality in Salihorsk District, Minsk Region, Belarus